The Revised Version (RV) or English Revised Version (ERV) of the Bible is a late 19th-century British revision of the King James Version. It was the first and remains the only officially authorised and recognised revision of the King James Version in Great Britain. The work was entrusted to over 50 scholars from various denominations in Great Britain. American scholars were invited to co-operate, by correspondence. Its New Testament was published in 1881, its Old Testament in 1885, and its Apocrypha in 1894. The best known of the translation committee members were Brooke Foss Westcott and Fenton John Anthony Hort; their fiercest critics of that period were John William Burgon, George Washington Moon, and George Saintsbury.

Features 
The New Testament revision company was commissioned in 1870 by the convocation of Canterbury. Their stated aim was "to adapt King James' version to the present state of the English language without changing the idiom and vocabulary," and "to adapt it to the present standard of Biblical scholarship." To those ends, the Greek text that was used to translate the New Testament was believed by most to be of higher reliability than the Textus Receptus. The readings used were compiled from a different text of the Greek Testament by Edwin Palmer.

While the text of the translation itself is widely regarded as excessively literal and flat, the Revised Version is significant in the history of English Bible translation for many reasons. At the time of the RV's publication, the nearly 300-year-old King James Version was the main Protestant English Bible in Victorian England. The RV, therefore, is regarded as the forerunner of the entire modern translation tradition. It was also considered more accurate than the King James Version in a number of verses.

New version 

The revisers were charged with introducing alterations only if they were deemed necessary to be more accurate and faithful to the Original Greek and Hebrew texts. In the New Testament alone more than 30,000 changes were made, over 5,000 on the basis of what were considered better Greek manuscripts. The work was begun in 1879, with the entire work completed in 1885. (The RV Apocrypha came out in 1895.)

The 1885 Revised Version was the first post-King James Version modern English Bible to gain popular acceptance. It was used and quoted favorably by ministers, authors, and theologians in the late 1800s and throughout the 1900s, such as Andrew Murray, T. Austin-Sparks, Watchman Nee, H.L. Ellison, F.F. Bruce, and Clarence Larkin, in their works. Other enhancements introduced in the RV include arrangement of the text into paragraphs, formatting Old Testament poetry as indented poetic lines instead of prose, and the inclusion of marginal notes to alert the reader to variations in wording in ancient manuscripts.  The Apocrypha in the Revised Version became the first printed edition in English to offer the complete text of Second Esdras, inasmuch as damage to one 9th-century manuscript had caused 70 verses to be omitted from previous editions and printed versions, including the King James Version.

In the United States, the Revised Version was adapted and revised as the "Revised Version, Standard American Edition" (the American Standard Version) in 1901. The American Standard Version is largely identical to the 1885 Revised Version, with minor variations in wording considered to be slightly more accurate. One noticeable difference is the much more frequent use of the form "Jehovah" in the Old Testament of the American Standard Version, rather than "the " that is used more so in the 1885 Revised Version, to represent the Divine Name, the Tetragrammaton.

The 1885 Revised Version and the 1901 American Revision are among the Bible versions authorized for use in services of the Episcopal Church and also of the Church of England.

Later history
The American Standard Version was the basis for many revisions in the first hundred years after it was released. The RV itself has never been the basis for any revision except for the American Standard Version and the Apocrypha in the Revised Standard Version.

As the Revised Version is out of copyright worldwide, it is widely available online and in digital and e-reader formats although it is significantly less popular than the KJV or the ASV in this manner. However, interest in the 1885 Revised Version has grown in recent years due to the internet, for general research and reference, and study of history of English Bible translations.    It is sparsely available in printed published form today, with only Cambridge University Press publishing it in the form of a KJV/RV interlinear.

See also 
 The New Testament in the Original Greek

Sources 
Marlowe, Michael D. "English Revised Version (1881-1895)". Retrieved March 22, 2004.
Hall, Isaac H. (ed.) "History of the English Revised Version (1881)". Retrieved March 22, 2004.
 Palmer, Edwin. ΚΑΙΝΗ ΔΙΑΘΗΚΗ. The Greek Testament with the Readings Adopted by the Revisers of the Authorised Version. London: Simon Wallenberg Press, 2007. 
Ryken, Leland (2002). The Word of God in English. Wheaton, IL: Crossway. 
Burgon, John William (1883). The Revision Revised.
 Bible: Apocrypha, Revised Version. The Apocrypha, Translated out of the Greek and Latin Tongues, Being the Version Set forth A.D. 1611 Compared with the Most Ancient Authorities and Revised A.D. 1894, [as] Printed for the Universities of Oxford and Cambridge. Cambridge: At the University Press, 1896. ix, 175 p.

Further reading
 Wegner, Paul D. Journey from Texts to Translations, The: The Origin and Development of the Bible, Baker Academic (August 1, 2004),  – The Revised Version is described in pages 314ff.

Notes

References

External links
The text of the RV online
The text of the RV with Apocrypha online
Prefaces to the English Revised Version (1881-85)
The New Testament, in the revised version of 1881, with fuller references (1910) – Cambridge University Press and Oxford University Press.Editors: Moulton, W. F. (William Fiddian), 1835-1898; Moulton, James Hope, 1863-1917; Greenup, A. W. (Albert William), 1866-1952; Scrivener, Frederick Henry Ambrose, 1813-1891.
The interlinear Bible : the Authorised version and the Revised version ; together with the marginal notes of both versions and central references (1907) – Cambridge University Press
 

1881 non-fiction books
1885 non-fiction books
1894 non-fiction books
19th-century Christian texts
Bible translations into English